Andrew John Preston "Andi" Spicer (1959 – 30 April 2020) was an English electroacoustic classical music composer who used electronics (see Electronic Music) in his compositions.

The composer was also a writer and journalist. He has contributed to The Wall Street Journal and The Gramophone as a reviewer, and has written for many international newspapers, magazines and news agencies, including Dow Jones Newswires, The Associated Press, The Independent, The Financial Times and The Observer. His music is published by Edition Tre Fontane in Münster, Germany.

History and influences
Spicer was born in Birmingham, England.

He studied economics at Aston University in Birmingham and pursued a career in journalism, while composing and performing free form improvised music (see free improvisation). He lived in Johannesburg, South Africa between 1996 and 2003, working as a foreign correspondent for major US and British newspapers, after which he moved back to England. He lived in Brighton from 2013, and was a member of the New Music Brighton and London Forum collectives of composers in the UK. His compositions have been featured at the Brighton Festival, Soundwaves Festival, Huddersfield Contemporary Music Festival, Goldsmiths College Pure Gold Festival, Royal College of Music in London, London COMA Summer School, Bille en Tête Festival (Musique En Roue Libre) in Arras, France, and at the All Ears Contemporary Music Festival in London, as well as at the Grahamstown Festival in South Africa and performed elsewhere in France, Italy, Sweden, Austria, Mexico and the US.

He was largely self-taught, although he took private lessons in composition and music theory with South African composer Martin Watt at the University of the Witwatersrand and composition workshops with British composer Michael Finnissy. His music uses improvisation, graphic notation, electronics (see electronic art music) and emphasises surface textures, but is also influenced by southern African and Asian world music.

He is associated with the Gallery III group of artists, musicians and multi-media artists in Johannesburg, South Africa, which included artist and musician James de Villiers and Beat poet Sinclair Beiles. Spicer is among a new generation of composers in post-apartheid South Africa. Other examples are Bongani Ndodana-Breen, Dimitri Voudouris, Jürgen Bräuninger, Cobi van Tonder, Hannes Taljaard, Michael Blake, Robert Fokkens and Spicer's teacher Martin Watt.

In 2019, he moved to Llandysul, Wales, and died there a year later from cancer.

Compositions
In Anglo Boer War (1999) he explored cluster note and microtonal techniques. The piece is a strident anti-war composition written for the hundredth anniversary of the Anglo Boer War (see Second Boer War) and was a collaboration with the artist James de Villiers.

His 63 Moons (2003) composition was influenced by the Javanese gamelan music, Shona mbira music and contemporary minimalist composers.

Click Language (2004) continued Spicer's African themes and uses sampled words from southern African click languages such as Xhosa (see Xhosa language), Zulu (see Zulu language) and Khoisan languages as a sound patina for four percussionists, comprising vibraphone, marimba, waterphone and other hand-held instruments. Baobab (2003) employs polyrhythms inspired by southern African drumming and features the vibraphone and marimba. There is a version of Baobab for harpsichord (2006), written for Polish harpsichordist Kasia Tomczak-Feltrin, and an extended version for harpsichordist Jane Chapman. He was writing an opera for video based on Arno Schmidt's novel The Egghead Republic (Die Gelehrtenrepublik).

Recent works explored live electronics and acoustic instrument blends, including MIDI instruments. Since the beginning of 2006, he worked closely with French woodwind and electronic music soloist and professor of woodwind at the London Royal College of Music, Julien Feltrin. Spicer has also worked with London-based percussion ensemble Brake Drum Assembly. He formed the ensemble Caos Harmonia to perform his music in 1997 and has also performed with London-based new music group, The Kluster Ensemble.

Film and video
Austrian video artist Peter Gold produced a short film for three movements of Anglo Boer War for the 2006 All Ears Contemporary Music Festival in London. Antarctica (1995–1996) is an early work for electronics written for an unreleased video of Antarctic landscapes.

Art installations
Spicer collaborated with performance artist Paolo Giudici in the installation Thesis at the Hockney Gallery at the Royal College of Art in London in 2006. Painter/multimedia artist James de Villiers worked with Spicer in The Architecture of Air, which toured the US, Mexico and South Africa in 2001–2003 with Transformations, an exhibition of South African art. Inside, Outside (2001) is an electronic piece for a James de Villiers' installation of the same title shown at the Carfax in Johannesburg.

Selected works
Antarctica (1995–96) – for electronics, video
Virtually Ambient Shostakovich (1997) – for voices, sampler and keyboards
Anglo Boer War (1999) – for voices, strings and electronic manipulation
String Quartet Four (2000) – for string quartet
Sequenzas (2000) – for piano
Auto da Fe (2002) – for orchestra
In Memoriam Valdemar Rodriquez (2002) – for orchestra
63 Moons (2003) – variations for world music instruments, percussion and synthesizers
Bigga Digga (2004) – for voices
Shakespeare Whispers (2004) – for voices
Baobab (2004) – for percussion quartet
''Click Language (2005) – for percussion quartet and electronicspHyTHoN (2005) – for French horn & pianoFour Pieces (2005) – for brass quintetBird (2006) – for vibraphone and electronicsEuclid Alone (2006) – for Paetzold Great Bass, tenor recorders & electronics, French horn and percussion quartetThe Anthropic Principle (2006) – for midi wind controller and laptopPolonnaruwa (2006) – for laptop electronicsBaobab (2004) – revised for harpsichord (2006)Haut Voltage (2006) – improvisation for midi wind controller, clarinet and laptop electronicsTiktaalik (2006) – for any instrumentThe Giraffe Sleeper (2007) – for chamber orchestra, piano and laptop electronicsCold, Cold (2007) – for laptop electronics and manipulated voice, words by Chris EdwardsFor Dimitri Voudouris (2007) – for laptop electronics, electronically manipulated alto saxophone and French hornThe Antikythera Mechanism (2008) – for natural horn  & electronicsNazca (2008) – for chamber orchestra & laptop electronicsHydrogen (2008) – for flute & laptop electronicsA Scent of Knife Blossom (2009) – for solo celloFor James de Villiers (2009) – for laptop electronicsArchaeopteryx (2010) – for low recorder quartet and electronicsThe Book of Graphic Scores (2010) – for any instrumentKailasanatha' (2012) – for laptops, violin, alto sax and electric guitar electronics (collaboration with Paul Sharma)Goodbye (2012) – for piano & electronics (in memory of Chris Edwards)Messestadt West (2014) - for electric guitar and digital looperCrow (2014) - for laptop electronicsSS 14a''' (2014) - for laptop electronics

References

External links
Andi Spicer's Official website

1959 births
2020 deaths
21st-century classical composers
20th-century classical composers
British classical composers
English electronic musicians
Experimental composers
Microtonal musicians
People from Birmingham, West Midlands
Alumni of Aston University
Male classical composers
20th-century English composers
20th-century British male musicians
21st-century British male musicians